Andrei Iosif Mureșan (born 1 August 1985) is a Romanian former professional footballer who played as a centre back. His father, Iosif Mureșan was also a footballer who played in the first two leagues for Universitatea Cluj.

Honours
Universitatea Cluj
 Liga II: 2006–07
Khazar Lankaran
Azerbaijan Cup: 2010–11
Astra Giurgiu
Cupa României: 2013–14
Sheriff Tiraspol
Moldovan Cup : 2014–15
CFR Cluj
Liga I: 2017–18, 2018–19, 2019–20
Cupa României: 2015–16
Supercupa României: 2018

References

External links
 

1985 births
People from Turda
Living people
Romanian footballers
Association football midfielders
FC Universitatea Cluj players
ACF Gloria Bistrița players
FC Kuban Krasnodar players
Khazar Lankaran FK players
FC Astra Giurgiu players
CFR Cluj players
FC Sheriff Tiraspol players
Liga I players
Liga II players
Russian Premier League players
Moldovan Super Liga players
Azerbaijan Premier League players
Romanian expatriate footballers
Expatriate footballers in Russia
Expatriate footballers in Azerbaijan
Expatriate footballers in Moldova
Romanian expatriate sportspeople in Russia
Romanian expatriate sportspeople in Azerbaijan